Roger Connors (fl. 1980s–2000s) is an American management consultant and author.

He is the co-author of four New York Times and Wall Street Journal best-selling books on the subjects of workplace accountability and culture change, The Oz Principle, Change the Culture, Change the Game, How Did That Happen?, and The Wisdom of Oz.

Career
In 1989, Roger Connors co-founded and was CEO of Partners In Leadership, an international management consulting and training company, specializing in workplace accountability and culture change. Their training materials have been translated into 14 languages, and they have conducted workshops in more than 100 countries. They have developed the “Three Tracks to Creating Greater Accountability,” a systematic training methodology which assists individuals and organizations in becoming more accountable to achieve business results. Over a million people have participated in the trainings to date. Their client list includes many of the Dow Jones Industrial Average and Fortune 50 largest companies. Through his research and experience, he is considered an expert on workplace accountability and also serves as a trainer and as a speaker. In 2018, Connors co-founded and is currently chairman of Zero To Ten, a coaching and leadership training company that originated Self-Directed Performance Coaching. He is ranked as one of the Top 30 Organizational Culture Gurus for 2020.

Bibliography
Connors has co-authored four books on the subject of workplace accountability, culture change, and coaching culture. The Oz Principle describes the steps necessary for individuals to take accountability to achieve desired results. How Did That Happen? describes how to effectively hold others accountable in a positive, principled way. Change the Culture, Change the Game describes the process of creating a culture of accountability within an organization. The book was previously released as Journey to the Emerald City in 2002. The Wisdom of Oz: Using Personal Accountability to Succeed in Everything You Do is focused on using accountability in personal relationships, including parenting, employment, health, and finances. Fix It is a comprehensive study on workplace accountability, discussing solutions for fixing low employee engagement and introduces the Workplace Accountability Study. Get A Coach, Be A Coach, set to be released on January 5, 2021, offers a unique approach to coaching by introducing Self-Directed Performance coaching, a multi-directional, non-hierarchical peer-to-peer coaching culture solution.

Biography
Connors received a Bachelor of Science in Accounting and an MBA with distinction, both from Brigham Young University. He was Area Vice President with Senn-Delaney Leadership Consulting, a Heidrick and Struggles company. While CEO of Partners In Leadership, his company was recognized with industry-leading awards from Chief Learning Officer, receiving Gold for Excellence in Social Learning (2015) and Gold for Excellence in Content (2014), as well as winning recognition as the No. 1 E-learning platform in the world in 2015 (which hosts over 1 million users). During that time, the company was also named to the Inc. 5000 fastest-growing privately held companies in America for two consecutive years, 2014 and 2015. Connors is currently a graduate faculty member for the MBA program at Utah Valley University in the Woodbury School of Business. From 2004 to 2007, he served as President of the Washington Kennewick Mission for the Church of Jesus Christ of Latter-day Saints.

References

Living people
American businesspeople
Brigham Young University alumni
American male writers
Year of birth missing (living people)